André Rey may refer to:

 André Rey (footballer) (born 1948), French former professional football goalkeeper
 André Rey (psychologist) (1906–1965), Swiss psychologist